Bylund is a surname. Notable people with the surname include:

 Ingamay Bylund (born 1947), Swedish equestrian and Olympic medallist
 Jonas Bylund (born 1963), Swedish classical trombonist
 Linus Bylund (born 1978), Swedish politician 
 Tuulikki Koivunen Bylund (born 1947),  Finnish-born Swedish theologian, bishop of Härnösand